Myles Beerman (born 13 March 1999) is a Maltese footballer who plays as a defender for Maltese Premier League club Sliema Wanderers.

Club career 

Beerman began his football career at Floriana in Malta before moving to England in 2014 to sign for Manchester City in a move which was investigated by FIFA. Beerman was released in May 2016 and then signed for Rangers after agreeing a two-year contract. Beerman made his professional debut for the Ibrox club in a Scottish Premiership match versus Kilmarnock on 6 April 2017, when he played at left-back.

On 4 January 2018, Beerman joined Scottish Championship club Queen of the South until the end of May 2018 on a development loan deal. On 17 May 2019, it was announced that Beerman would be released by Rangers at the end of the season.

On 15 August 2019, Beerman joined Maltese side Hibernians on a three-year contract.

In February 2023, Beerman was awarded the man of the match in the Maltese Challenge league. This award was sponsored by the kitchen store.

International career 

Beerman has represented Malta at various age levels and featured at the 2014 UEFA Under-17 Championship in Malta, aged only fifteen. On 9 May 2017, Beerman was selected for the Malta national football team for the first time in his career at 18-years-old. Beerman was also eligible to play for the England national team through his father. In June 2017, Beerman made his debut for Malta in a friendly match versus Ukraine.

Career statistics

References

External links 
 
 

1999 births
Living people
Association football defenders
Floriana F.C. players
Manchester City F.C. players
Rangers F.C. players
Queen of the South F.C. players
Birkirkara F.C. players
Hibernians F.C. players
Scottish Professional Football League players
Maltese Premier League players
Maltese footballers
Maltese expatriate footballers
Maltese expatriate sportspeople in Scotland
Maltese expatriate sportspeople in England
Malta international footballers
Malta under-21 international footballers